Neopotamia triloba is a moth of the family Tortricidae. It is found in Vietnam.

The wingspan is about 21 mm. The ground colour of the forewings is grey with brown-grey suffusions. The strigulae (fine streaks) and dots are dark grey and blackish grey. The hindwings are creamish brown.

Etymology
The specific name refers to the termination of the postbasal process of the basal cavity of the valva forming three lobes.

References

Moths described in 2009
Olethreutini
Moths of Asia
Taxa named by Józef Razowski